Enrique Gabriel Jiménez Remus (March 23, 1940 – December 30, 2016) was a Mexican diplomat, lawyer, politician and member of the National Action Party (PAN). Jimenez served in the Senate of the Republic from 1994 to 2000.  He was then appointed as Mexico's Ambassador to Spain and Andorra from 2001 to 2007, as well as Ambassador to Cuba from 2007 until 2013.

Jiménez was born in Guadalajara, Jalisco, on March 23, 1940. He received his law degree from National Autonomous University of Mexico (UNAM). He worked as a lawyer for Celanese Mexicana and the Mexican division of Nestlé, headquartered in Ocotlán, during his legal career.

Jiménez joined the opposition National Action Party (PAN) in 1979, at a time when the ruling Institutional Revolutionary Party (PRI) dominated Mexican politics. He ran unsuccessfully for Governor of Jalisco in 1982, but lost to the PRI candidate. He then served in the state Congress of Jalisco from 1988 to 1991. He was then elected to the national Senate from 1994 to 2000, where he also served as the PAN parliamentary coordinator.

Jiménez was appointed Ambassador to Spain from 2001 to 2007.  He then served as Ambassador to neighboring Cuba from 2007 to 2013.

Gabriel Jiménez Remus died at a private hospital in Guadalajara on December 28, 2016, at the age of 76.

References

1940 births
2016 deaths
Ambassadors of Mexico to Cuba
Ambassadors of Mexico to Spain
Ambassadors of Mexico to Andorra
Members of the Senate of the Republic (Mexico)
Members of the Congress of Jalisco
20th-century Mexican lawyers
Politicians from Guadalajara, Jalisco
National Action Party (Mexico) politicians
National Autonomous University of Mexico alumni